Maria Owings Shriver (born November 6, 1955)
is an American journalist, author, a member of the Kennedy family, former First Lady of California, and the founder of the nonprofit organization The Women's Alzheimer's Movement. She was married to former governor of California and actor Arnold Schwarzenegger, from whom she filed for divorce in 2011 and which was finalized in 2021. 

Shriver began her journalism career at CBS station KYW-TV and briefly anchored the CBS Morning News before joining NBC News in 1986. After anchoring weekend editions of the Today show and the NBC Nightly News, she became a correspondent for Dateline NBC, also covering politics. After leaving NBC News in 2004 to focus on her role as First Lady of California, she returned in 2013 as a special anchor. For her reporting at NBC, Shriver received a Peabody Award in 1998 and was co-anchor for NBC's Emmy-winning coverage of the 1988 Summer Olympics.

As executive producer of The Alzheimer's Project, Shriver earned two Emmy Awards and an Academy of Television Arts & Sciences award for developing a "television show with a conscience."

Early life
Shriver was born in Presbyterian Hospital in Chicago, Illinois, on November 6, 1955, the second child of politician Sargent Shriver and activist Eunice Kennedy. She is a niece of the late U.S. president John F. Kennedy, U.S. attorney general and U.S. senator Robert F. Kennedy, U.S. senator Ted Kennedy, and six other siblings. A Roman Catholic, she is of mostly Irish and German descent.

Shriver spent her middle school years living in Paris, France, save for a brief period where Shriver's family temporarily moved to Chicago, Illinois in the summer of 1968 following Eunice Kennedy Shriver's work with the Special Olympics.

Shriver permanently returned from France to Bethesda, Maryland, in 1970, where she attended Stone Ridge School of the Sacred Heart high school and graduated in 1973, later attending Manhattanville College in Purchase, New York for two years, then transferring into a Bachelor of Arts degree in American studies at Georgetown University in Washington, DC, graduating in June 1977.

Shriver is a fourth cousin of tennis player Pam Shriver. Shriver is also a cousin of Caroline Kennedy.

Career

Media career and advocacy
In her book Ten Things I Wish I'd Known Before I Went Out Into The Real World (2000), Shriver says that she became passionate about broadcast journalism after being sent to the back of the campaign plane with the press corps while volunteering for her father's 1972 U.S. vice presidential race, calling these orders "the best thing that ever happened to me". After her journalism career began with KYW-TV in Philadelphia, Pennsylvania, she co-anchored The CBS Morning News with Forrest Sawyer from August 1985 until August 1986, co-anchored NBC News's Sunday Today from 1987 until 1990. Shriver also served as Saturday anchor 1989 & Sunday 1990 of NBC Nightly News. She was a contributing anchor on Dateline NBC from 1992 until 2004. In August 2003, Shriver took an unpaid leave of absence from NBC News when her husband became a candidate in the 2003 California gubernatorial recall election.

Following her husband's November 17, 2003, inauguration as the 38th Governor of California, she became the First Lady of California. She then returned to reporting, making two more appearances for Dateline NBC.

On February 3, 2004, Shriver asked to be "relieved of [her] duties at NBC News," citing concerns the network had over the conflict of interest between her role as a journalist and her status as the First Lady of California and her increasing role as an advocate of her husband's administration.

She appeared as herself in the film Last Action Hero (1993). She also played a minor role as herself in "Be Prepared", a 2006 episode of the television series That's So Raven promoting a "Preparedness Plan". On March 23, 2007, Shriver returned to television news as substitute host of panel-discussion talk show Larry King Live on CNN with musician Sheryl Crow and other guests.

Shriver announced that she would not return to the news media after the excessive media coverage of the death of Anna Nicole Smith. Shriver subsequently returned to the news media.

In 2003, Shriver's father Sargent Shriver was diagnosed with Alzheimer's disease, and she became an advocate and fundraiser for Alzheimer's patient care and biomedical research. Shriver was the executive producer of The Alzheimer's Project, a four-part documentary series that premiered on HBO in May 2009 and later earned two Emmy Awards. It was described by the Los Angeles Times as "ambitious, disturbing, emotionally fraught and carefully optimistic". The series took a close look at cutting-edge research being done in the country's leading Alzheimer's laboratories. The documentary also examined the effects of this disease on patients and families. One of the Emmy Award-winning films, Grandpa, Do you Know Who I Am? is based on Shriver's best-selling children's book dealing with Alzheimer's.

In 2016, Shriver published the coloring book Color Your Mind, a coloring book for people with Alzheimer's.

Shriver has been a lifelong advocate for people with intellectual disabilities. She is a member of the International Board of Special Olympics, the organization her mother founded in 1968. She is also on the advisory board of Best Buddies, a one-to-one friendship and jobs program for people with intellectual disabilities. In addition, Shriver serves as Chair of the Audi Best Buddies Challenge: Hearst Castle, a bike ride that raises millions of dollars for programs supporting people with intellectual disabilities. As First Lady, Shriver has been instrumental in the hiring of individuals with intellectual disabilities in the capitol and in various state offices through her WE Include program. In February 2008, Shriver launched an ice cream company called Lovin' Scoopful with her brother, Tim Shriver. Twenty-five percent of the proceeds from Lovin' Scoopful benefits the Special Olympics.

In 2008, Shriver executive-produced American Idealist: The Story of Sargent Shriver. The documentary originally aired on PBS on January 21, 2008. The film chronicled the life, accomplishments and vision of her father, Sargent Shriver. Shriver also serves on the advisory board of the Sargent Shriver Peace Institute, which raises public awareness of her father's legacy as a peacebuilder and offers educational and training programs grounded in the principles of public service that motivate the many programs he created, including the Peace Corps, Job Corps, Head Start, and Legal Services for the Poor.

In 2018, she published I've Been Thinking...: Reflections Prayers and Meditations for a Meaningful Life, which became an instant No. 1 New York Times bestseller. Shriver released a companion journal, I've Been Thinking...The Journal: Reflections, Prayers and Inspirations for Your Meaningful Life, in January 2019.

Shriver and her daughter, Christina Schwarzenegger, were co-executive producers of Take Your Pills (2018), an hour-long documentary on psychostimulant medications.

The Shriver Report 
In October 2009, Shriver launched "The Shriver Report: A Woman's Nation Changes Everything," a national study and comprehensive report conducted in partnership with the Center for American Progress, USC's Annenberg Center on Communication, Leadership and Policy, and the Rockefeller Foundation. The Shriver Report revealed that American women, for the first time, make up half of the United States workforce and studied how that fact is impacting major institutions like family, business, government and faith organizations. The report was released in 2013 in partnership with TIME and NBC News. According to The New York Times, the report "was modeled on a study undertaken almost 50 years ago during the administration of John F. Kennedy, Shriver's uncle, and led by Eleanor Roosevelt." The report features, among other things, writings by public figures including Suze Orman, Beyoncé, Tammy Duckworth, Billie Jean King, Heidi Hartmann, Susan J. Douglas, Stephanie Coontz, Kristin Rowe-Finkbeiner, John Podesta, and Oprah Winfrey.

In 2010 The Shriver Report: A Woman's Nation Takes on Alzheimer's was published. It is a study by Maria Shriver and the Alzheimer's Association. It features, among other things, writings by public figures including Barbra Streisand, Laura Bush, Patti Davis, Soleil Moon Frye, Rosalynn Carter, Susan Collins, Kathleen Sebelius, Barbara Mikulski, and Joe Biden.

In 2014, The Shriver Report: A Woman's Nation Pushes Back from the Brink was published; it is about women and their children in poverty. It is by Maria Shriver, with editors Olivia Morgan, and Karen Skelton, and features, among other things, writings by public figures including Carol Gilligan, Beyoncé, Joan Chittister, Ai-Jen Poo, Eva Longoria, Stephanie Coontz, Jennifer Garner, Kathleen Sebelius, Jada Pinkett Smith, Anne-Marie Slaughter, Tory Burch, Sheryl Sandberg, Kirsten Gillibrand, Barbara Ehrenreich, LeBron James, and Hillary Clinton.

First Lady of California
After Arnold took office, Shriver took on several key initiatives as First Lady, which included raising awareness of the contributions of women to the state, working on practical solutions to end cycles of poverty, and encouraging all Californians to engage in acts of service to their communities. Once Schwarzenegger was elected, Shriver had to cut back on her news reporting to avoid conflicts of interest.

Shriver began leading the California Governor & First Lady's Conference on Women when Schwarzenegger took office in 2003. Under her leadership, The Women's Conference event grew into the nation's premier forum for women and, in 2010, attracted more than 30,000 attendees and 150 world opinion leaders over three full days. Each year, the event is held at the Long Beach Convention Center in October. Luminaries have spoken at the conference including Oprah Winfrey, Associate Justice of the U.S. Supreme Court Sandra Day O'Connor, U.S. Secretaries of State Condoleezza Rice and Madeleine Albright, Barbara Walters, Warren Buffett, Governor Arnold Schwarzenegger, former British Prime Minister Tony Blair, Richard Branson, Bono, Billie Jean King, Gloria Steinem, and the Dalai Lama.

In 2004, Shriver created The Minerva Awards to honor and reward "remarkable California women" who have changed their communities, their state, their country and the world with their courage, wisdom and strength. The Minerva Awards are named after Minerva, the Roman goddess who adorns the California State Seal and "who symbolizes the dual nature of women as warriors and peacemakers". The Minerva Awards are presented annually at The Women's Conference in Long Beach during a special ceremony. Recipients of the award also receive a grant to continue their work. Past Minerva Awards recipients include former first lady Betty Ford, Nancy Pelosi, Gloria Steinem, Billie Jean King, astronaut Sally Ride and the late Eunice Kennedy Shriver, Shriver's mother. The achievements of The Minerva Award winners are chronicled in a permanent exhibit at The California Museum for History, Women and the Arts in Sacramento and have become part of California's official state archive.

In 2004, Shriver was in attendance at both the Democratic National Convention and the Republican National Convention, attending the first to watch her uncle Ted Kennedy speak, and the latter to watch her husband speak.

In 2005, Shriver launched her WE Connect Program, which connects working families in need with money-saving programs and support services. WE Connect brings together community organizations and businesses, government agencies and state leaders, congregations and schools as partners in responding to the needs of the millions of individuals and families who are struggling to make ends meet. Through a partnership with La Opinion, the nation's largest Spanish-language newspaper, WE Connect has developed three editions of a 24-page, full-color, bilingual supplement that has been circulated to over 20 million Californians in need. In December 2009, Shriver, in partnership with The Women's Conference, created the WE Connect–Million Meals Initiative. Through this initiative, The Women's Conference made a donation to The California Association of Food Banks to provide more than one million meals to California families in need. The donation was allocated to the food bank's 44 member organizations who then distributed the food to California families through its more than 5,000 community-based organizations. In March 2010, Shriver held a three-day Community Resources Fair in Fresno and Los Angeles through WE Connect. The fairs provided vital programs and free support services such as tax preparation, housing and home foreclosure assistance, job assistance, flu shots, healthy food distribution and more. Event organizers estimated that over 40,000 individuals took advantage of free services during the course of the two weekends, and hundreds of thousands pounds of food were distributed.

As First Lady, Shriver worked to promote service and volunteerism. As Honorary Chair of CaliforniaVolunteers, Shriver conceived of and launched the largest statewide volunteer matching network at CaliforniaVolunteers.org. Shriver was instrumental in inspiring Governor Schwarzenegger to establish the nation's first state cabinet-level Department of Service and Volunteering. She also pioneered and promoted a statewide disaster preparedness program called WE Prepare that encourages and educates Californians to be ready for an emergency or natural disaster. In addition, Shriver established WE Build and WE Garden, a children's playground and community garden-building initiative. “Try growing Tomatoes, I’ beans don't grow,” she exclaimed.  Through CaliforniaVolunteers, Shriver has built 31 playgrounds with gardens in lower-income communities around the state in partnership with KaBOOM!.

In 2008, Shriver launched her WE Invest Program, which provides training, mentoring, support networks, microloans and other resources to help women launch or grow their businesses. In June 2009, she expanded WE Invest nationally through a partnership with Kiva, creating the first-ever online peer-to-peer microlending program in the U.S. Shriver is credited with coming up with the idea to bring Kiva's international micro-lending model to the United States.

Shriver is Co-Chair of The California Museum for History, Women and the Arts and she has been credited with revitalizing the state museum during her tenure. Shriver created the California Hall of Fame in 2006 at the Museum to honor legendary Californians such as Cesar Chavez, Clint Eastwood, Walt Disney, Amelia Earhart, Ronald Reagan, John Steinbeck, Rita Moreno, Earl Warren, Julia Morgan, Leland Stanford, Dorothea Lange and others. In November 2008, Shriver launched the California Legacy Trails, a first-of-its-kind web-based multimedia learning tool designed to help students learn California history.

On February 3, 2008, Shriver endorsed Senator Barack Obama for the 2008 Democratic presidential nomination. The endorsement was given at a UCLA rally featuring Caroline Kennedy (Shriver's cousin), Oprah Winfrey, Stevie Wonder, and Obama's wife Michelle Obama. Governor Schwarzenegger had endorsed Senator John McCain for the Republican presidential nomination a few days earlier on January 31, 2008. Later that year, as in 2004, Shriver was in attendance at the Democratic National Convention when her uncle Ted Kennedy spoke.

In May 2009, Shriver planted the first edible garden at a state capitol in what once was a flower bed. She teamed up with Alice Waters on the project. The food grown in the organic garden is distributed to local food banks. Shriver has been an advocate for edible gardens and chairs the California School Garden Network that has doubled the number of gardens in state schools from 3,000 to 6,000 since 2004.

Return to NBC News
On April 30, 2013, NBC announced that Shriver would join the network again as a special anchor working on issues surrounding the shifting roles of women in American life.

On October 18, 2013, Shriver returned to the anchor desk on Today, filling-in for Savannah Guthrie for the first time since 1998 as co-anchor with Matt Lauer.

Career timeline
 1978–1985: KYW-TV anchor
 1985–1986: The CBS Morning News co-anchor
 1986–2004: NBC News
 1987–1990: Sunday Today co-anchor
 1989 NBC Nightly News Saturday anchor–1990: Sunday anchor
 1992–2004: Dateline NBC contributing anchor & correspondent
 2003–2011: First Lady of California
 2013–present: NBC News
 2013–present: Special Anchor
 2013–2015: Dateline NBC correspondent
 2013–present: Today substitute co-anchor
 2019–present: Hoda & Jenna substitute co-anchor

Personal life

In 1977, Tom Brokaw introduced Maria to Austrian bodybuilder and actor Arnold Schwarzenegger at a charity tennis tournament being held at her mother's home. She married Schwarzenegger on April 26, 1986, in Hyannis, Massachusetts, at St. Francis Xavier Roman Catholic Church. They have four children; two boys and two girls, including Katherine and Patrick.

On May 9, 2011, Schwarzenegger and Shriver announced their separation after 25 years of marriage, and Shriver moved out of the couple's Brentwood mansion. In a message for her Twitter followers posted on May 13, 2011, Shriver said: "Thank you all for the kindness, support and compassion. I am humbled by the love. Thank you."

On May 17, 2011, Schwarzenegger publicly admitted to fathering a child with a longtime member of their household staff 14 years earlier and before his election as Governor of California. He confessed to Shriver only after she confronted him with the information, having earlier confirmed what she had suspected about the child in a confrontation with her former employee. Shriver described Schwarzenegger's admission as "painful and heartbreaking". She declined to speak further on the issue, saying: "As a mother, my concern is for the children. I ask for compassion, respect and privacy as my children and I try to rebuild our lives and heal." Shriver filed for divorce on July 1, 2011, citing "irreconcilable differences". The divorce was finalized in December 2021.

In an interview with the Commonwealth Club of California in 2018, Shriver revealed that she had changed her registration from Democrat to independent, stating that there are good people and bad people in both parties.

Honors
As executive producer of The Alzheimer's Project, Shriver earned two Emmy Awards and an Academy of Television Arts & Sciences award for developing a "television show with a conscience". She has additionally won Peabody Awards for her television journalism.

In 2009, Shriver was honored with the Shinnyo-en Foundation's 2009 Pathfinders to Peace Award, which is bestowed annually to a person who exemplifies the ideals of compassion, harmony, and peace. At the presentation ceremony honoring Shriver, the foundation's chief executive said, "Maria Shriver sees the best in other people – their innate goodness – and inspires them to become their own 'Architects of Change'. In a world that glorifies ambition at any cost, Maria instead teaches character. She is a woman of quiet strength who role-models kindness and charity, and has used her celebrity to help create peace in the world."

The Saint John's Health Center has a nursery named after Shriver.

A hybrid rose was named after Shriver in October 2004. The Maria Shriver rose contains starchy-white blooms and a powerful citrus fragrance. 

In 2017, the Alzheimer's Association awarded Shriver with its first-ever Lifetime Achievement Award.

Books

See also

 Kennedy family

References

External links

 
 A Woman's Nation
 The Shriver Report
 
 
 

20th-century American women writers
20th-century American writers
21st-century American non-fiction writers
21st-century American women writers
Alzheimer's disease activists
American disability rights activists
American health activists
American children's writers
American feminists
American people of German descent
American people of Irish descent
American self-help writers
American television news anchors
American television reporters and correspondents
American women children's writers
American women television journalists
California Democrats
Catholics from Illinois
Catholics from Maryland
CBS News people
First Ladies and Gentlemen of California
Georgetown College (Georgetown University) alumni
Illinois Democrats
Journalists from Illinois
Kennedy family
Living people
Manhattanville College alumni
NBC News people
News & Documentary Emmy Award winners
Peabody Award winners
People from Bethesda, Maryland
People from Brentwood, Los Angeles
People from Potomac, Maryland
Roman Catholic writers
Schools of the Sacred Heart alumni
Schwarzenegger family
Shriver family
Westland Middle School alumni
Writers from Chicago
Writers from Los Angeles
Writers from Maryland
1955 births